The Commodore 64, also known as the C64, is an 8-bit home computer introduced in January 1982 by Commodore International (first shown at the Consumer Electronics Show, January 7–10, 1982, in Las Vegas). It has been listed in the Guinness World Records as the highest-selling single computer model of all time, with independent estimates placing the number sold between 12.5 and 17 million units. Preceded by the VIC-20 and Commodore PET, the C64 took its name from its   of RAM. With support for multicolor sprites and a custom chip for waveform generation, the C64 could create superior visuals and audio compared to systems without such custom hardware.

The C64 dominated the low-end computer market (except in the UK and Japan, lasting only about six months in Japan) for most of the later years of the 1980s. For a substantial period (1983–1986), the C64 had between 30% and 40% share of the US market and two million units sold per year, outselling IBM PC compatibles, Apple computers, and the Atari 8-bit family of computers. Sam Tramiel, a later Atari president and the son of Commodore's founder, said in a 1989 interview, "When I was at Commodore we were building  C64s a month for a couple of years." In the UK market, the C64 faced competition from the BBC Micro, the ZX Spectrum, and later the Amstrad CPC 464. but the C64 was still the second most popular computer in the UK after the ZX Spectrum. The Commodore 64 failed to make any impact in Japan. The Japanese market was dominated by Japanese computers, such as the NEC PC-8801, Sharp X1, Fujitsu FM-7, and MSX.

Part of the Commodore 64's success was its sale in regular retail stores instead of only electronics or computer hobbyist specialty stores. Commodore produced many of its parts in-house to control costs, including custom integrated circuit chips from MOS Technology. In the United States, it has been compared to the Ford Model T automobile for its role in bringing a new technology to middle-class households via creative and affordable mass-production. Approximately 10,000 commercial software titles have been made for the Commodore 64, including development tools, office productivity applications, and video games. C64 emulators allow anyone with a modern computer, or a compatible video game console, to run these programs today. The C64 is also credited with popularizing the computer demoscene and is still used today by some computer hobbyists. In 2011, 17 years after it was taken off the market, research showed that brand recognition for the model was still at 87%.

History 

In January 1981, MOS Technology, Inc., Commodore's integrated circuit design subsidiary, initiated a project to design the graphic and audio chips for a next-generation video game console. Design work for the chips, named MOS Technology VIC-II (Video Integrated Circuit for graphics) and MOS Technology SID (Sound Interface Device for audio), was completed in November 1981. Commodore then began a game console project that would use the new chips—called the Ultimax or the Commodore MAX Machine, engineered by Yash Terakura from Commodore Japan. This project was eventually cancelled after just a few machines were manufactured for the Japanese market. At the same time, Robert "Bob" Russell (system programmer and architect on the VIC-20) and Robert "Bob" Yannes (engineer of the SID) were critical of the current product line-up at Commodore, which was a continuation of the Commodore PET line aimed at business users. With the support of Al Charpentier (engineer of the VIC-II) and Charles Winterble (manager of MOS Technology), they proposed to Commodore CEO Jack Tramiel a low-cost sequel to the VIC-20. Tramiel dictated that the machine should have  of random-access memory (RAM). The team was able to quickly design the computer because, unlike most other home-computer companies, Commodore had its own semiconductor fab to produce test chips; because the fab was not running at full capacity, development costs were part of existing corporate overhead. The chips were complete by November, by which time Charpentier, Winterble, and Tramiel had decided to proceed with the new computer; the latter set a final deadline for the first weekend of January, to coincide with the 1982 Consumer Electronics Show (CES).

The product was code named the VIC-40 as the successor to the popular VIC-20. The team that constructed it consisted of Yash Terakura, Shiraz Shivji, Bob Russell, Bob Yannes, and David A. Ziembicki. The design, prototypes, and some sample software were finished in time for the show, after the team had worked tirelessly over both Thanksgiving and Christmas weekends. The machine used the same case, same-sized motherboard, and same Commodore BASIC 2.0 in ROM as the VIC-20. BASIC also served as the user interface shell and was available immediately on startup at the READY prompt. When the product was to be presented, the VIC-40 product was renamed C64. The C64 made an impressive debut at the January 1982 Consumer Electronics Show, as recalled by Production Engineer David A. Ziembicki: "All we saw at our booth were Atari people with their mouths dropping open, saying, 'How can you do that for $595?

Reception 
At that price it promises to be one of the hottest contenders in the under- personal computer market." It described the SID as "a true music synthesizer ... the quality of the sound has to be heard to be believed", while criticizing the use of Commodore BASIC 2.0, the floppy disk performance which is "even slower than the Atari 810 drive", and Commodore's quality control. BYTE gave more details, saying the C64 had "inadequate Commodore BASIC 2.0. An 8K-byte interpreted BASIC" which they assumed was because "Obviously, Commodore feels that most home users will be running prepackaged software - there is no provision for using graphics (or sound as mentioned above) from within a BASIC program except by means of POKE commands." This was one of very few warnings about C64 BASIC published in any computer magazines. 
 Creative Computing said in December 1984 that the C64 was "the overwhelming winner" in the category of home computers under . Despite criticizing its "slow disk drive, only two cursor directional keys, zero manufacturer support, non-standard interfaces, etc.", the magazine said that at the C64's price of less than  "you can't get another system with the same features: 64K, color, sprite graphics, and barrels of available software". The Tandy Color Computer was the runner up.

Market war: 1982–1983 

Commodore had a reputation for announcing products that never appeared, so sought to quickly ship the C64. Production began in the spring of 1982, and volume shipments began in August. The C64 faced a wide range of competing home computers, but with a lower price and more flexible hardware, it quickly outsold many of its competitors.

In the United States, the greatest competitors were the Atari 8-bit 400, the Atari 800, and the Apple II. The Atari 400 and 800 had been designed to accommodate previously stringent FCC emissions requirements and so were expensive to manufacture. Though similar in specifications, the C64 and Apple II represented differing design philosophies; as an open architecture system, upgrade capability for the Apple II was granted by internal expansion slots, whereas the C64's comparatively closed architecture had only a single external ROM cartridge port for bus expansion. However, the Apple II used its expansion slots for interfacing with common peripherals like disk drives, printers, and modems; the C64 had a variety of ports integrated into its motherboard, which were used for these purposes, usually leaving the cartridge port free. Commodore's was not a completely closed system, however, the company had published detailed specifications for most of their models since the Commodore PET and VIC-20 days, and the C64 was no exception. C64 sales were nonetheless relatively slow due to a lack of software, reliability issues with early production models, particularly high failure rates of the PLA chip, which used a new production process, and a shortage of 1541 disk drives, which also suffered rather severe reliability issues.

Commodore sold the C64 not only through its network of authorized dealers but also through department stores, discount stores, toy stores and college bookstores. The C64 had a built-in RF modulator and thus could be plugged into any television set. This allowed it (like its predecessor, the VIC-20) to compete directly against video game consoles such as the Atari 2600. Like the Apple IIe, the C64 could also output a composite video signal, avoiding the RF modulator altogether. This allowed the C64 to be plugged into a specialized monitor for a sharper picture. Unlike the IIe, the C64's NTSC output capability also included separate luminance/chroma signal output equivalent to (and electrically compatible with) S-Video, for connection to the Commodore 1702 monitor, providing even better video quality than a composite signal.

Aggressive pricing of the C64 is considered to have been a major catalyst in the video game crash of 1983. In January 1983, Commodore offered a $100 rebate in the United States on the purchase of a C64 to anyone that traded in another video game console or computer. This deal meant that the consumer could send the TS1000 to Commodore, collect the rebate, and pocket the difference; Timex Corporation departed the computer market within a year. Commodore's tactics soon led to a price war with the major home computer manufacturers. The success of the VIC-20 and C64 contributed significantly to the exit from the field of Texas Instruments and other smaller competitors.

The price war with Texas Instruments was seen as a personal battle for Commodore president Jack Tramiel. Commodore dropped the C64's list price by  within two months of its release. At one point, the company was selling as many C64s as all computers sold by the rest of the industry combined. TI's subsequent demise in the home computer industry in October 1983 was seen as revenge for TI's tactics in the electronic calculator market in the mid-1970s, when Commodore was almost bankrupted by TI.

One key to the C64's success was Commodore's aggressive marketing tactics, and they were quick to exploit the relative price/performance divisions between its competitors with a series of television commercials after the C64's launch in late 1982. The company also published detailed documentation to help developers, while Atari initially kept technical information secret.

Although many early C64 games were inferior Atari 8-bit ports, by late 1983, the growing installed base caused developers to create new software with better graphics and sound. It was the only non-discontinued, widely available home computer by then, with more than 500,000 sold during the Christmas season; because of production problems in Atari's supply chain, by the start of 1984 "the Commodore 64 largely has [the low-end] market to itself right now", The Washington Post reported.

1984–1987 

With sales booming and the early reliability issues with the hardware addressed, software for the C64 began to grow in size and ambition during 1984. This growth shifted to the primary focus of most US game developers. The two holdouts were Sierra, who largely skipped over the C64 in favor of Apple and PC-compatible machines, and Broderbund, who were heavily invested in educational software and developed primarily around the Apple II. In the North American market, the disk format had become nearly universal while cassette and cartridge-based software all but disappeared. So most US-developed games by this point grew large enough to require multi-loading.

At a mid-1984 conference of game developers and experts at Origins Game Fair, Dan Bunten, Sid Meier, and a representative of Avalon Hill said that they were developing games for the C64 first as the most promising market. By 1985, games were an estimated 60 to 70% of Commodore 64 software. Computer Gaming World stated in January 1985 that companies such as Epyx that survived the video game crash did so because they "jumped on the Commodore bandwagon early". Over 35% of SSI's 1986 sales were for the C64, ten points higher than for the Apple II. The C64 was even more important for other companies, which often found that more than half the sales for a title ported to six platforms came from the C64 version. That year, Computer Gaming World published a survey of ten game publishers that found that they planned to release forty-three Commodore 64 games that year, compared to nineteen for Atari and forty-eight for Apple II, and Alan Miller stated that Accolade developed first for the C64 because "it will sell the most on that system".

In Europe, the primary competitors to the C64 were British-built computers: the Sinclair ZX Spectrum, the BBC Micro, and the Amstrad CPC 464. The Spectrum quickly became the market leader and Commodore had an uphill struggle against it in the marketplace. The C64 did however go on to rival the Spectrum in popularity in the latter half of the 1980s. Adjusted to the population size, the popularity of Commodore 64 was the highest in Finland at roughly 3 units per 100 inhabitants, where it was subsequently marketed as "the Computer of the Republic".

Rumors spread in late 1983 that Commodore would discontinue the C64. Commodore sold about one million C64s in 1985 and a total of 3.5 million by mid-1986. Although the company reportedly attempted to discontinue the C64 more than once in favor of more expensive computers such as the Commodore 128, demand remained strong. In 1986, Commodore introduced the 64C, a redesigned 64, which Compute! saw as evidence that—contrary to C64 owners' fears that the company would abandon them in favor of the Amiga and 128—"the 64 refuses to die". Its introduction also meant that Commodore raised the price of the C64 for the first time, which the magazine cited as the end of the home-computer price war. Software sales also remained strong; MicroProse, for example, in 1987 cited the Commodore and IBM PC markets as its top priorities.

1988–1994 
By 1988, PC compatibles were the largest and fastest-growing home and entertainment software markets, displacing former leader Commodore. Commodore 64 software sales were almost unchanged in the third quarter of 1988 year over year while the overall market grew 42%, but the company was still selling 1 to 1.5 million units worldwide each year of what Computer Chronicles that year called "the Model T of personal computers". Epyx CEO David Shannon Morse cautioned that "there are no new 64 buyers, or very few. It's a consistent group that's not growing... it's going to shrink as part of our business." One computer gaming executive stated that the Nintendo Entertainment System's enormous popularityseven million sold in 1988, almost as many as the number of C64s sold in its first five yearshad stopped the C64's growth. Trip Hawkins reinforced that sentiment, stating that Nintendo was "the last hurrah of the 8-bit world".

SSI exited the Commodore 64 market in 1991, after most competitors. Ultima VI, released in 1991, was the last major C64 game release from a North American developer, and The Simpsons, published by Ultra Games, was the last arcade conversion. The latter was a somewhat uncommon example of a US-developed arcade port as after the early years of the C64, most arcade conversions were produced by UK developers and converted to NTSC and disk format for the US market, American developers instead focusing on more computer-centered game genres such as RPGs and simulations. In the European market, disk software was rarer and cassettes were the most common distribution method; this led to a higher prevalence of arcade titles and smaller, lower-budget games that could fit entirely in the computer's memory without requiring multiloads. European programmers also tended to exploit advanced features of the C64's hardware more than their US counterparts.

In the United States, demand for 8-bit computers all but ceased as the 1990s began and PC compatibles completely dominated the computer market. However, the C64 continued to be popular in the UK and other European countries. The machine's eventual demise was not due to lack of demand or the cost of the C64 itself (still profitable at a retail price point between £44 and £50), but rather because of the cost of producing the disk drive. In March 1994, at CeBIT in Hanover, Germany, Commodore announced that the C64 would be finally discontinued in 1995, noting that the Commodore 1541 cost more than the C64 itself.

However, only one month later in April 1994, the company filed for bankruptcy. When Commodore went bankrupt, all production on their inventory, including the C64, was discontinued, thus ending the C64's 11 and a half year production. Claims of sales of 17, 22 and 30 million of C64 units sold worldwide have been made. Company sales records, however, indicate that the total number was about 12.5 million. Based on that figure, the Commodore 64 was still the third most popular computing platform into the 21st century until 2017 when the Raspberry Pi family replaced it. While 360,000 C64s were sold in 1982, about 1.3 million were sold in 1983, followed by a large spike in 1984 when 2.6 million were sold. After that, sales held steady at between 1.3 and 1.6 million a year for the remainder of the decade and then dropped off after 1989. North American sales peaked between 1983 and 1985 and gradually tapered off afterward, while European sales remained quite strong into the early 1990s.

C64 family

Commodore MAX 

In 1982, Commodore released the Commodore MAX Machine in Japan. It was called the Ultimax in the United States and VC-10 in Germany. The MAX was intended to be a game console with limited computing capability and was based on a cut-down version of the hardware family later used in the C64. The MAX was discontinued months after its introduction because of poor sales in Japan.

Commodore Educator 64 

1983 saw Commodore attempt to compete with the Apple II's hold on the US education market with the Educator 64, essentially a C64 and "greenscale" monochrome monitor in a PET case. Schools preferred the all-in-one metal construction of the PET over the standard C64's separate components, which could be easily damaged, vandalized, or stolen. Schools did not prefer the Educator 64 to the wide range of software and hardware options the Apple IIe was able to offer, and it was produced in limited quantities.

SX-64 

Also in 1983, Commodore released the SX-64, a portable version of the C64. The SX-64 has the distinction of being the first commercial full-color portable computer. While earlier computers using this form factor only incorporate monochrome ("green screen") displays, the base SX-64 unit features a  color cathode-ray tube (CRT) and one integrated 1541 floppy disk drive. Even though Commodore claimed in advertisements that it would have dual 1541 drives, when the SX-64 was released there was only one and the other became a floppy disk storage slot. Also, unlike most other C64s, the SX-64 does not have a datasette connector so an external cassette was not an option.

Commodore 128 

Two designers at Commodore, Fred Bowen and Bil Herd, were determined to rectify the problems of the Plus/4. They intended that the eventual successors to the C64—the Commodore 128 and 128D computers (1985)—were to build upon the C64, avoiding the Plus/4's flaws. The successors had many improvements such as a BASIC with graphics and sound commands (like almost all home computers not made by Commodore), 80-column display ability, and full CP/M compatibility. The decision to make the Commodore 128 plug compatible with the C64 was made quietly by Bowen and Herd, software and hardware designers respectively, without the knowledge or approval by the management in the post Jack Tramiel era. The designers were careful not to reveal their decision until the project was too far along to be challenged or changed and still make the impending Consumer Electronics Show (CES) in Las Vegas. Upon learning that the C128 was designed to be compatible with the C64, Commodore's marketing department independently announced that the C128 would be 100% compatible with the C64, thereby raising the bar for C64 support. In a case of malicious compliance, the 128 design was altered to include a separate "64 mode" using a complete C64 environment to try to ensure total compatibility.

Commodore 64C 

The C64's designers intended the computer to have a new, wedge-shaped case within a year of release, but the change did not occur. In 1986, Commodore released the 64C computer, which is functionally identical to the original. The exterior design was remodeled in the sleeker style of the Commodore 128. The 64C uses new versions of the SID, VIC-II, and I/O chips being deployed. Models with the C64E board had the graphic symbols printed on the top of the keys, instead of the normal location on the front. The sound chip (SID) was changed to use the MOS 8580 chip, with the core voltage reduced from 12V to 9V. The most significant changes include different behavior in the filters and in the volume control, which result in some music/sound effects sounding differently than intended, and in digitally-sampled audio being almost inaudible, respectively (though both of these can mostly be corrected-for in software). The 64 KB RAM memory went from eight chips to two chips. BASIC and the KERNAL went from two separate chips into one 16 KB ROM chip. The PLA chip and some TTL chips were integrated into a DIL 64-pin chip. The "252535-01" PLA integrated the color RAM as well into the same chip. The smaller physical space made it impossible to put in some internal expansions like a floppy-speeder. In the United States, the 64C was often bundled with the third-party GEOS graphical user interface (GUI)-based operating system, as well as the software needed to access Quantum Link. The 1541 drive received a matching face-lift, resulting in the 1541C. Later, a smaller, sleeker 1541-II model was introduced, along with the  3.5-inch microfloppy 1581.

Commodore 64 Games System 

In 1990, the C64 was repackaged in the form of a game console, called the C64 Games System (C64GS), with most external connectivity removed. A simple modification to the 64C's motherboard was made to allow cartridges to be inserted from above. A modified ROM replaced the BASIC interpreter with a boot screen to inform the user to insert a cartridge. Designed to compete with the Nintendo Entertainment System and the Sega Master System, it suffered from very low sales compared to its rivals. It was another commercial failure for Commodore, and it was never released outside Europe. The Commodore game system lacked a keyboard, so any software that required a keyboard could not be used.

Commodore 65 

In 1990, an advanced successor to the C64, the Commodore 65 (also known as the "C64DX"), was prototyped, but the project was canceled by Commodore's chairman Irving Gould in 1991. The C65's specifications were impressive for an 8-bit computer, bringing specs comparable to the 16-bit Apple IIGS. For example, it could display 256 colors on the screen, while OCS based Amigas could only display 64 in HalfBrite mode (32 colors and half-bright transformations). Although no specific reason was given for the C65's cancellation, it would have competed in the marketplace with Commodore's lower-end Amigas and the Commodore CDTV.

Software 

In 1982, the C64's graphics and sound capabilities were rivaled only by the Atari 8-bit family and appeared exceptional when compared with the widely publicized Atari VCS and Apple II. The C64 is often credited with starting the computer subculture known as the demoscene (see Commodore 64 demos). It is still being actively used in the demoscene, especially for music (its SID sound chip even being used in special sound cards for PCs, and the Elektron SidStation synthesizer). Even though other computers quickly caught up with it, the C64 remained a strong competitor to the later video game consoles Nintendo Entertainment System (NES) and Sega Master System, thanks in part to its by-then established software base, especially outside North America, where it comprehensively outsold the NES.

Because of lower incomes and the domination of the Sinclair Spectrum in the UK, almost all British C64 software used cassette tapes. Few cassette C64 programs were released in the US after 1983 and, in North America, the diskette was the principal method of software distribution. The cartridge slot on the C64 was also mainly a feature used in the computer's first two years on the US market and became rapidly obsolete once the price and reliability of 1541 drives improved. A handful of PAL region games used bank switched cartridges to get around the 16 KB memory limit.

BASIC 

As is common for home computers of the early 1980s, the C64 comes with a BASIC interpreter, in ROM. KERNAL, I/O, and tape/disk drive operations are accessed via custom BASIC language commands. The disk drive has its own interfacing microprocessor and ROM (firmware) I/O routines, much like the earlier CBM/PET systems and the Atari 400 and Atari 800. This means that no memory space is dedicated to running a disk operating system, as was the case with earlier systems such as the Apple II and TRS-80.

Commodore BASIC 2.0 is used instead of the more advanced BASIC 4.0 from the PET series, since C64 users were not expected to need the disk-oriented enhancements of BASIC 4.0. The company did not expect many to buy a disk drive, and using BASIC 2.0 simplified VIC-20 owners' transition to the 64. "The choice of BASIC 2.0 instead of 4.0 was made with some soul-searching, not just at random. The typical user of a C64 is not expected to need the direct disk commands as much as other extensions, and the amount of memory to be committed to BASIC were to be limited. We chose to leave expansion space for color and sound extensions instead of the disk features. As a result, you will have to handle the disk in the more cumbersome manner of the 'old days'."

The version of Microsoft BASIC is not very comprehensive and does not include specific commands for sound or graphics manipulation, instead requiring users to use the "PEEK and POKE" commands to access the graphics and sound chip registers directly. To provide extended commands, including graphics and sound, Commodore produced two different cartridge-based extensions to BASIC 2.0: Simons' BASIC and Super Expander 64. Other languages available for the C64 include Pascal, C, Logo, Forth, and FORTRAN. Compilers for BASIC 2.0 such as Petspeed 2 (from Commodore), Blitz (from Jason Ranheim), and Turbo Lightning (from Ocean Software) were produced. Most commercial C64 software was written in assembly language, either cross-developed on a larger computer, or directly on the C64 using a machine code monitor or an assembler. This maximized speed and minimized memory use. Some games, particularly adventures, used high-level scripting languages and sometimes mixed BASIC and machine language.

Alternative operating systems 
Many third-party operating systems have been developed for the C64. As well as the original GEOS, two third-party GEOS-compatible systems have been written: Wheels and GEOS megapatch. Both of these require hardware upgrades to the original C64. Several other operating systems are or have been available, including WiNGS OS, the Unix-like LUnix, operated from a command-line, and the embedded systems OS Contiki, with full GUI. Other less well-known OSes include ACE, Asterix, DOS/65, and GeckOS. A version of CP/M was released, but this requires the addition of an external Z80 processor to the expansion bus. Furthermore, the Z80 processor is underclocked to be compatible with the C64's memory bus, so performance is poor compared to other CP/M implementations. C64 CP/M and C128 CP/M both suffer a lack of software; although most commercial CP/M software can run on these systems, software media is incompatible between platforms. The low usage of CP/M on Commodores means that software houses saw no need to invest in mastering versions for the Commodore disk format. The C64 CP/M cartridge is also not compatible with anything except the early 326298 motherboards.

Networking software 
During the 1980s, the Commodore 64 was used to run bulletin board systems using software packages such as Punter BBS, Bizarre 64, Blue Board, C-Net, Color 64, CMBBS, C-Base, DMBBS, Image BBS, EBBS, and The Deadlock Deluxe BBS Construction Kit, often with sysop-made modifications. These boards sometimes were used to distribute cracked software. As late as December 2013, there were 25 such Bulletin Board Systems in operation, reachable via the Telnet protocol. There were major commercial online services, such as Compunet (UK), CompuServe (US later bought by America Online), The Source (US), and Minitel (France) among many others. These services usually required custom software which was often bundled with a modem and included free online time as they were billed by the minute. Quantum Link (or Q-Link) was a US and Canadian online service for Commodore 64 and 128 personal computers that operated from November 5, 1985, to November 1, 1994. It was operated by Quantum Computer Services of Vienna, Virginia, which in October 1991 changed its name to America Online and continued to operate its AOL service for the IBM PC compatible and Apple Macintosh. Q-Link was a modified version of the PlayNET system, which Control Video Corporation (CVC, later renamed Quantum Computer Services) licensed.

Online gaming 

The first graphical character-based interactive environment is Club Caribe. First released as Habitat in 1988, Club Caribe was introduced by LucasArts for Q-Link customers on their Commodore 64 computers. Users could interact with one another, chat and exchange items. Although the game's open world was very basic, its use of online avatars and the combination of chat and graphics was revolutionary. Online graphics in the late 1980s were severely restricted by the need to support modem data transfer rates as low as 300 bits per second. Habitat's graphics were stored locally on floppy disk, eliminating the need for network transfer.

Hardware

CPU and memory 

The C64 uses an 8-bit MOS Technology 6510 microprocessor. It is almost identical to the 6502 but with three-state buses, a different pinout, slightly different clock signals and other minor changes for this specific application. It also has six I/O lines on otherwise unused legs on the 40-pin IC package. These are used for two purposes in the C64: to bank-switch the machine's read-only memory (ROM) in and out of the processor's address space, and to operate the datasette tape recorder. As the processor could only address  at a time, the ROM was mapped into memory, and only  of RAM (plus  in between the ROMs) were available at startup. Most "breadbin" Commodore 64s used 4164 DRAM, with eight chips to total up 64K of system RAM. Thus, the first chip contains Bit 0 for the entire memory space, the second chip contains Bit 1, and so forth. This also makes detecting faulty RAM easy, as a bad chip will display random characters on the screen and the character displayed can be used to determine the faulty RAM.

The C64 performs a RAM test on power up and if a RAM error is detected, the amount of free BASIC memory will be lower than the normal 38911 figure. If the faulty chip is in lower memory, then an ?OUT OF MEMORY IN 0 error is displayed rather than the usual BASIC startup banner. The color RAM at $D800 uses a separate 2114 SRAM chip and is gated directly to the VIC-II.

The C64 uses a somewhat complicated memory banking scheme; the normal power-on default is to have the BASIC ROM mapped in at - and the screen editor/KERNAL ROM at –. RAM underneath the system ROMs can be written to, but not read back without swapping out the ROMs. If the KERNAL ROM is swapped out, BASIC will be removed at the same time, and it is not possible to have BASIC active without the KERNAL (as BASIC often calls KERNAL routines and part of the ROM code for BASIC is in fact located in the KERNAL ROM).

The character ROM is normally not visible to the CPU. The character ROM may be mapped into – where it is then visible to the CPU. Since doing so necessitates swapping out the I/O registers, interrupts must be disabled first.

By removing I/O from the memory map, – becomes free RAM. If all ROMs and the I/O area are swapped out, the entire 64k RAM space is available aside for locations /.

– is free RAM and not used by BASIC or KERNAL routines; because of this, it is an ideal location to store short machine language programs that can be accessed from BASIC. The cassette buffer at – can also be used to store short machine language routines provided that a Datasette is not used, which will overwrite the buffer.

A few early C64 cartridges released in 1982 use Ultimax mode (or MAX mode), a leftover feature of the failed MAX Machine. These cartridges map into  and displace the KERNAL ROM. If Ultimax mode is used, the programmer will have to provide code for handling system interrupts. The cartridge port has 16 address lines, which grants access to the entire address space of the computer if needed. Disk and tape software normally load at the start of BASIC memory ($0801) and use a small BASIC stub (e.g., 10 SYS(2064)) to jump to the start of the program. Although no Commodore 8-bit machine except the C128 can automatically boot from a floppy disk, some software intentionally overwrites certain BASIC vectors in the process of loading so that execution begins automatically rather than requiring the user to type RUN at the BASIC prompt following loading.

Around 300 cartridges were released for the C64, mostly in the machine's first  years on the market, after which most software outgrew the  cartridge limit. In the final years of the C64, larger software companies such as Ocean Software began releasing games on bank-switched cartridges to overcome this  cartridge limit.

Commodore did not include a reset button on any of their computers until the CBM-II line, but there were third-party cartridges with a reset button on them. A few programs use this as an "exit" feature, although it does not clear memory.

The KERNAL ROM went through three separate revisions, mostly designed to fix bugs. The initial version is only found on 326298 motherboards, used in the first production models, and cannot detect whether an NTSC or PAL VIC-II is present. The second revision is found on all C64s made from late 1982 through 1985. The third and last KERNAL ROM revision was introduced on the 250466 motherboard (late breadbin models with 41464 RAM) and is found in all C64Cs. A small performance boost can be gained by disabling the VIC-II's video output via a register write. This feature is often used by tape and disk fastloaders as well as the KERNAL cassette routine to keep a standard CPU cycle timing not modified by the VIC-II's sharing of the bus.

The Restore key is gated directly to the CPU's NMI line and will generate an NMI if pressed. The KERNAL handler for the NMI checks if Run/Stop is also pressed; if not, it ignores the NMI and simply exits back out. Run/Stop-Restore normally functions as a soft reset in BASIC that restores all I/O registers to their power on default state, but does not clear memory or reset pointers, so any BASIC programs in memory will be left untouched. Machine language software usually disables Run/Stop-Restore by remapping the NMI vector to a dummy RTI instruction. The NMI can be used for an extra interrupt thread by programs as well, but runs the risk of a system lockup or undesirable side effects if the Restore key is accidentally pressed, as this will trigger an inadvertent activation of the NMI thread.

Joysticks, mice, and paddles 

The C64 retained the DE-9 joystick Atari joystick port from the VIC-20 and added another; any Atari-specification game controller can be used on a C64. Although it is possible to use Sega game pads on a C64, it is not recommended as the slightly different signal generated by them can damage the CIA chip. The SID chip's register  is used to control paddles and is an analog input. Atari paddles are electrically compatible with the C64, but have different resistance values than Commodore's paddles, which means most software will not work properly with them. However, only a handful of games, mostly ones released early in the computer's life cycle, can use paddles. In 1986, Commodore released two mice for the C64 and C128, the 1350 and 1351. The 1350 is a digital device, read from the joystick registers (and can be used with any program supporting joystick input); while the 1351 is a true, analog potentiometer based, mouse, read with the SID's analog-to-digital converter.

Graphics 

The graphics chip, VIC-II, features 16 colors, eight hardware sprites per scanline (enabling up to 112 sprites per PAL screen), scrolling capabilities, and two bitmap graphics modes.

Text modes 

The standard text mode features 40 columns, like most Commodore PET models; the built-in character encoding is not standard ASCII but PETSCII, an extended form of ASCII-1963. The KERNAL ROM sets the VIC-II to a dark blue background on power up with a light blue text and border. Unlike the PET and VIC-20, the C64 uses "fat" double-width text as some early VIC-IIs had poor video quality that resulted in a fuzzy picture. Most screenshots show borders around the screen, which is a feature of the VIC-II chip. By utilizing interrupts to reset various hardware registers on precise timings it was possible to place graphics within the borders and thus use the full screen.

The C64 has a resolution of 320×200 pixels, consisting of a 40×25 grid of 8×8 character blocks. The C64 has 255 predefined character blocks, called PETSCII. The character set can be copied into RAM and altered by a programmer.

There are two colour modes, high resolution, with two colours available per character block (one foreground and one background) and multicolour with four colours per character block (three foreground and one background). In multicolour mode, attributes are shared between pixel pairs, so the effective visible resolution is 160×200 pixels. This is necessary since only 16 KB of memory is available for the VIC-II video processor.

As the C64 has a bitmapped screen, it is possible to draw each pixel individually. This is, however, very slow. Most programmers used techniques developed for earlier non-bitmapped systems, like the Commodore PET and TRS-80. A programmer redraws the character set and the video processor fills the screen block by block from the top left corner to the bottom right corner.

Two different types of animation are used: character block animation and hardware sprites.

Character block animation
The user draws a series of characters of a person walking, say, two in the middle of the block, and another two walking in and out of the block. Then the user sequences them so the character walks into the block and out again. Drawing a series of these and the user gets a person walking across the screen. By timing the redraw to occur when the television screen blanks out to restart drawing the screen there will be no flicker. For this to happen, the user programs the VIC-II that it generates a raster interrupt when the video flyback occurs. This is the technique used in the classic Space Invaders arcade game.

Horizontal and vertical pixelwise scrolling of up to one character block is supported by two hardware scroll registers. Depending on timing, hardware scrolling affects the entire screen or just selected lines of character blocks. On a non-emulated C64, scrolling is glasslike and blur-free.

Hardware sprites

A sprite is a movable character which moves over an area of the screen, draws over the background and then redraws it after it moves. Note this is very different from character block animation, where the user is just flipping character blocks. On the C64, the VIC-II video processor handles most of the legwork in sprite emulation; the programmer simply defines the sprite and where they want it to go.

The C64 has two types of sprites, respecting their colour mode limitations. Hi-res sprites have one colour (one background and one foreground) and multicolour sprites three (one background and three foreground). Colour modes can be split or windowed on a single screen. Sprites can be doubled in size vertically and horizontally up to four times their size, but the pixel attributes are the same – the pixels become "fatter". There are 8 sprites in total and all 8 can be shown in each horizontal line concurrently. Sprites can move with glassy smoothness in front of and behind screen characters and other sprites.

The hardware sprites of a C64 can be displayed on either a bitmapped (high resolution) screen or, alternatively, on a text mode screen in conjunction with fast and smooth character block animation. In contrast, software emulated sprites found on systems without support for hardware sprites such as the Apple II and ZX Spectrum required a bitmapped screen. 

Sprite-sprite and sprite-background collisions are detected in hardware and the VIC-II can be programmed to trigger an interrupt accordingly.

Sound 

The SID chip has three channels, each with its own ADSR envelope generator and filter capabilities. Ring modulation makes use of channel no. 3, to work with the other two channels. Bob Yannes developed the SID chip and later co-founded synthesizer company Ensoniq. Yannes criticized other contemporary computer sound chips as "primitive, obviously ... designed by people who knew nothing about music". Often the game music has become a hit of its own among C64 users. Well-known composers and programmers of game music on the C64 are Rob Hubbard, Jeroen Tel, Tim Follin, David Whittaker, Chris Hülsbeck, Ben Daglish, Martin Galway, Kjell Nordbø and David Dunn among many others. Due to the chip's three channels, chords are often played as arpeggios, coining the C64's characteristic lively sound. It was also possible to continuously update the master volume with sampled data to enable the playback of 4-bit digitized audio. As of 2008, it became possible to play four channel 8-bit audio samples, 2 SID channels and still use filtering.

There are two versions of the SID chip: the 6581 and the 8580. The MOS Technology 6581 was used in the original ("breadbin") C64s, the early versions of the 64C, and the Commodore 128. The 6581 was replaced with the MOS Technology 8580 in 1987. While the 6581 sound quality is a little crisper and many Commodore 64 fans say they prefer its sound, it lacks some versatility available in the 8580 – for example, the 8580 can mix all available waveforms on each channel, whereas the 6581 can only mix waveforms in a channel in a much more limited fashion. The main difference between the 6581 and the 8580 is the supply voltage. The 6581 uses a  supply—the 8580, a  supply. A modification can be made to use the 6581 in a newer 64C board (which uses the  chip). The SID chip's distinctive sound has allowed it to retain a following long after its host computer was discontinued. A number of audio enthusiasts and companies have designed SID-based products as add-ons for the C64, x86 PCs, and standalone or Musical Instrument Digital Interface (MIDI) music devices such as the Elektron SidStation. These devices use chips taken from excess stock, or removed from used computers. In 2007, Timbaland's extensive use of the SidStation led to the plagiarism controversy for "Block Party" and "Do It" (written for Nelly Furtado).

In 1986, the Sound Expander was released for the Commodore 64. It was a sound module that contained a Yamaha YM3526 sound chip capable of FM synthesis. It was primarily intended for professional music production.

Hardware revisions 

Commodore made many changes to the C64's hardware during its lifetime, sometimes causing compatibility issues. The computer's rapid development, and Commodore and Tramiel's focus on cost cutting instead of product testing, resulted in several defects that caused developers like Epyx to complain and required many revisions to fix; Charpentier said that "not coming a little close to quality" was one of the company's mistakes.

Cost reduction was the reason for most of the revisions. Reducing manufacturing costs was vitally important to Commodore's survival during the price war and leaner years of the 16-bit era. The C64's original (NMOS based) motherboard went through two major redesigns and numerous sub-revisions, exchanging positions of the VIC-II, SID and PLA chips. Initially, a large portion of the cost was eliminated by reducing the number of discrete components, such as diodes and resistors, which enabled the use of a smaller printed circuit board. There were 16 total C64 motherboard revisions, aimed at simplifying and reducing manufacturing costs. Some board revisions were exclusive to PAL regions. All C64 motherboards were manufactured in Hong Kong.

IC locations changed frequently on each motherboard revision, as did the presence or lack thereof of the metal RF shield around the VIC-II. PAL boards often had aluminized cardboard instead of a metal shield. The SID and VIC-II are socketed on all boards; however, the other ICs may be either socketed or soldered. The first production C64s, made in 1982 to early 1983, are known as "silver label" models due to the case sporting a silver-colored "Commodore" logo. The power LED had a separate silver badge around it reading "64". These machines also have only a 5-pin video cable and cannot output S-video. In late 1982, Commodore introduced the familiar "rainbow badge" case, but many machines produced into early 1983 also used silver label cases until the existing stock of them was used up. In the spring of 1983, the original 326298 board was replaced by the 250407 motherboard which sported an 8-pin video connector and added S-video support for the first time. This case design was used until the C64C appeared in 1986. All ICs switched to using plastic shells while the silver label C64s had some ceramic ICs, notably the VIC-II. The case is made from ABS plastic which may become brown with time. This can be reversed by using a process known as "retrobright".

ICs 
Internally, the clock was divided down to generate the dot clock (about 8 MHz) and the two-phase system clocks (about 1 MHz; the exact pixel and system clock speeds are slightly different between NTSC and PAL machines). At such high clock rates, the chip generated a lot of heat, forcing MOS Technology to use a ceramic dual in-line package called a "CERDIP". The ceramic package was more expensive, but it dissipated heat more effectively than plastic.

After a redesign in 1983, the VIC-II was encased in a plastic dual in-line package, which reduced costs substantially, but it did not totally eliminate the heat problem. Without a ceramic package, the VIC-II required the use of a heat sink. To avoid extra cost, the metal RF shielding doubled as the heat sink for the VIC, although not all units shipped with this type of shielding. Most C64s in Europe shipped with a cardboard RF shield, coated with a layer of metal foil. The effectiveness of the cardboard was highly questionable and, worse still, it acted as an insulator, blocking airflow which trapped heat generated by the SID, VIC, and PLA chips. The SID was originally manufactured using NMOS at 7 micrometers and in some areas 6 micrometers. The prototype SID and some very early production models featured a ceramic dual in-line package, but unlike the VIC-II, these are extremely rare as the SID was encased in plastic when production started in early 1982.

Motherboard 
In 1986, Commodore released the last revision to the classic C64 motherboard. It was otherwise identical to the 1984 design, except for the two 64 kilobit × 4 bit DRAM chips that replaced the original eight 64 kilobit × 1 bit ICs. After the release of the Commodore 64C, MOS Technology began to reconfigure the original C64's chipset to use HMOS production technology. The main benefit of using HMOS was that it required less voltage to drive the IC, which consequently generates less heat. This enhanced the overall reliability of the SID and VIC-II. The new chipset was renumbered to 85xx to reflect the change to HMOS.

In 1987, Commodore released a 64C variant with a highly redesigned motherboard commonly known as a "short board". The new board used the new HMOS chipset, featuring a new 64-pin PLA chip. The new "SuperPLA", as it was dubbed, integrated many discrete components and transistor–transistor logic (TTL) chips. In the last revision of the 64C motherboard, the 2114 4-bit-wide color RAM was integrated into the SuperPLA.

Power supply 

The C64 used an external power supply, a conventional transformer with multiple tappings (as opposed to switch mode, the type now used on PC power supplies). It was encased in an epoxy resin gel, which discouraged tampering but tended to increase the heat level during use. The design saved space within the computer's case and allowed international versions to be more easily manufactured. The 1541-II and 1581 disk drives, along with various third-party clones, also come with their own external power supply "bricks", as did most peripherals leading to a "spaghetti" of cables and the use of numerous double adapters by users.

Commodore power supplies often failed sooner than expected. The computer reportedly had a 30% return rate in late 1983, compared to the 5–7% the industry considered acceptable. Creative Computing reported four working computers out of seven C64s. Malfunctioning power bricks were particularly notorious for damaging the RAM chips. Due to their higher density and single supply (+5V), they had less tolerance for an overvoltage condition. The usually failing voltage regulator could be replaced by piggy-backing a new regulator onto the board and fitting a heat sink on top.

The original PSU included on early 1982–83 machines had a 5-pin connector that could accidentally be plugged into the video output of the computer. To prevent the user from making this damaging mistake, Commodore changed the plug design on 250407 motherboards to a 3-pin connector in 1984. Commodore later changed the design yet again, omitting the resin gel in order to reduce costs. The follow-on model, the Commodore 128, used a larger, improved power supply that included a fuse. The power supply that came with the Commodore REU was similar to that of the Commodore 128's unit, providing an upgrade for customers who purchased that accessory.

Specifications

Internal hardware 
 Microprocessor CPU:
 MOS Technology 6510/8500 (the 6510/8500 is a modified 6502 with an integrated 6-bit I/O port)
 Clock speed:  or 
 Video: MOS Technology VIC-II 6567/8562 (NTSC), 6569/8565 (PAL)
 16 colors
 Text mode: 40×25 characters; 256 user-defined chars (8×8 pixels, or 4×8 in multicolor mode); or extended background color; 64 user-defined chars with 4 background colors, 4-bit color RAM defines foreground color
 Bitmap modes: 320×200 (2 unique colors in each 8×8 pixel block), 160×200 (3 unique colors + 1 common color in each 4×8 block)
 8 hardware sprites of 24×21 pixels (12×21 in multicolor mode)
 Smooth scrolling, raster interrupts
 Sound: MOS Technology 6581/8580 SID
 3-channel synthesizer with programmable ADSR envelope
 8 octaves
 4 waveforms per audio channel: triangle, sawtooth, variable pulse, noise
 Oscillator synchronization, ring modulation
 Programmable filter: high pass, low pass, band pass, notch filter
 Input/Output: Two 6526 Complex Interface Adapters
 16 bit parallel I/O
 8 bit serial I/O
 24-hours (AM/PM) Time of Day clock (TOD), with programmable alarm clock
 16 bit interval timers
 RAM:
 64 KB, of which 38 KB were available for BASIC programs
 1024 nybbles color RAM (memory allocated for screen color data storage)
 Expandable to 320 KB with Commodore 1764 256 KB RAM Expansion Unit (REU); although only 64 KB directly accessible; REU used mostly for the GEOS. REUs of 128 KB and 512 KB, originally designed for the C128, were also available, but required the user to buy a stronger power supply from some third party supplier; with the 1764 this was included.
Creative Micro Designs also produced a 2 MB REU for the C64 and C128, called the 1750 XL. The technology actually supported up to 16 MB, but 2 MB was the biggest one officially made. Expansions of up to 16 MB were also possible via the CMD SuperCPU.
 ROM:
  ( Commodore BASIC 2.0;  KERNAL;  character generator, providing two  character sets)

Input/output (I/O) ports and power supply 

 I/O ports:
 ROM cartridge expansion slot (44-pin slot for edge connector with 6510 CPU address/data bus lines and control signals, as well as GND and voltage pins; used for program modules and memory expansions, among others)
 Integrated RF modulator television antenna output via an RCA connector. The used channel could be adjusted from number 36 with the potentiometer to the left.
 8-pin DIN connector containing composite video output, separate Y/C outputs and sound input/output. This is a 262° horseshoe version of the plug, rather than the 270° circular version. Early C64 units (with motherboard Assy 326298) use a 5-pin DIN connector that carries composite video and luminance signals, but lacks a chroma signal.
 Serial bus (proprietary serial version of IEEE-488, 6-pin DIN plug) for CBM printers and disk drives
 PET-type Commodore Datassette 300 baud tape interface (edge connector with digital cassette motor/read/write/key-sense signals), Ground and +5V DC lines. The cassette motor is controlled by a +5V DC signal from the 6510 CPU. The 9V AC input is transformed into unregulated 6.36V DC which is used to actually power the cassette motor.
 User port (edge connector with TTL-level signals, for modems and so on; byte-parallel signals which can be used to drive third-party parallel printers, among other things, 17 logic signals, 7 Ground and voltage pins, including 9V AC)
 2 × screwless DE9M game controller ports (compatible with Atari 2600 controllers), each supporting five digital inputs and two analog inputs. Available peripherals included digital joysticks, analog paddles, a light pen, the Commodore 1351 mouse, and graphics tablets such as the KoalaPad.
 Power supply:
 5V DC and 9V AC from an external "power brick", attached to a 7-pin female DIN-connector on the computer.

The  is used to supply power via a charge pump to the SID sound generator chip, provide  via a rectifier to the cassette motor, a "0" pulse for every positive half wave to the time-of-day (TOD) input on the CIA chips, and  directly to the user-port. Thus, as a minimum, a  square wave is required. But a  sine wave is preferred.

Memory map 

Note that even if an I/O chip like the VIC-II only uses 64 positions in the memory address space, it will occupy 1,024 addresses because some address bits are left undecoded.

Peripherals

Manufacturing cost 
Vertical integration was the key to keeping Commodore 64 production costs low. At the introduction in 1982, the production cost was US$135 and the retail price US$595. In 1985, the retail price went down to US$149 (US$ today) and the production costs were believed to be somewhere between US$35–50 ( Commodore would not confirm this cost figure. Dougherty of the Berkeley Softworks estimated the costs of the Commodore 64 parts based on his experience at Mattel and Imagic.

To lower costs, TTL chips were replaced with less expensive custom chips and ways to increase the yields on the sound and graphics chips were found. The video chip 6567 had the ceramic package replaced with plastic but heat dissipation demanded a redesign of the chip and the development of a plastic package that can dissipate heat as well as ceramic.

Clones 

Clones are computers that imitate C64 functions. In the middle of 2004, after an absence from the marketplace of more than 10 years, PC manufacturer Tulip Computers BV (owners of the Commodore brand since 1997) announced the C64 Direct-to-TV (C64DTV), a joystick-based TV game based on the C64 with 30 video games built into ROM. Designed by Jeri Ellsworth, a self-taught computer designer who had earlier designed the modern C-One C64 implementation, the C64DTV was similar in concept to other mini-consoles based on the Atari 2600 and Intellivision, which had gained modest success earlier in the decade. The product was advertised on QVC in the United States for the 2004 holiday season. By modifying the circuit board, it is possible to attach C1541 floppy disk drives, a second joystick, and PS/2 keyboards to these units, which gives the DTV devices nearly all the capabilities of a full Commodore 64. The DTV hardware is also used in the mini-console Hummer, sold at RadioShack in mid-2005.

In 2015, a Commodore 64 compatible motherboard was produced by Individual Computers. Dubbed the "C64 Reloaded", it is a modern redesign of the Commodore 64 motherboard revision 250466 with a few new features. The motherboard itself is designed to be placed in an empty C64 or C64C case already owned by the user. Produced in limited quantities, models of this Commodore 64 "clone" sport either machined or ZIF sockets in which the custom C64 chips would be placed. The board also contains jumpers to accept different revisions of the VIC-II and SID chips, as well as the ability to jumper between the analogue video system modes PAL and NTSC. The motherboard contains several innovations, including selection via the RESTORE key of multiple KERNAL and character ROMs, built-in reset toggle on the power switch, and an S-video socket to replace the original TV modulator.

Newer compatible hardware 
As of 2008, C64 enthusiasts still develop new hardware, including Ethernet cards, specially adapted hard disks and flash card interfaces (sd2iec). In 2022 a product called A-SID was introduced that turns the C-64 into a WAH effect.

Brand reuse 

In 1998, the C64 brand was reused for the "Web.it Internet Computer", a low-powered Internet-oriented all-in-one x86 PC running MS-DOS and Windows 3.1. It uses a AMD Élan SC400 SoC with 16 MB of RAM, a 3.5" floppy disk drive 56k-modem and PCMCIA.  Despite its "Commodore 64" nameplate, the "C64 Web.it" is not directly compatible with the original (except via included emulation software), nor does it share its appearance. PC clones branded as C64x sold by Commodore USA, LLC, a company licensing the Commodore trademark, began shipping in June 2011. The C64x has a case resembling the original C64 computer, but – as with the "Web.it" – it is based on a x86 architecture and is not compatible with the Commodore 64 on either hardware or software levels.

Virtual Console 
Several Commodore 64 games were released on the Nintendo Wii's Virtual Console service in Europe and North America only. The games were unlisted from the service as of August 2013 for unknown reasons.

THEC64 and THEC64 Mini 

THEC64 Mini is an unofficial Linux-based console that emulates the Commodore 64, released in 2018 by UK-based Retro Games. The console takes the form of a decorative half-scale Commodore 64 with two USB and one HDMI port, plus a mini USB connection to power the system. The console's decorative keyboard is non-functional – the system is controlled via the included THEC64 joystick or a separate USB keyboard. It is possible to load new software ROMs into the console, which uses emulator x64 (as part of VICE) to run software, and has a built-in graphical operating system.

The full-size THEC64 was released in 2019 in Europe and Australia, and was scheduled for release in November 2020 in the North American market. The console and built-in keyboard are built to scale with the original Commodore 64, including a functional keyboard. Enhancements include VIC-20 emulation, four USB ports, and an upgraded joystick.

Neither product features any of Commodore's trademarks – the Commodore key on the original keyboard is replaced with a THEC64 key, and Retro Games can call neither product a "C64" – although the system ROMs are licensed from Cloanto Corporation. The consoles can be switched between "carousel mode" for accessing the built-in game library, and "classic mode" in which the machine operates similarly to a traditional Commodore 64. USB storage can be used to hold disk, cartridge and tape images for use with the machine.

Emulators 
Commodore 64 emulators include the open source VICE, Hoxs64, and CCS64. An iPhone app was also released with a compilation of C64 ports.

See also 
 List of Commodore 64 games
 History of personal computers
 IDE64 – P-ATA interface cartridge for the C64
 SuperCPU – CPU upgrade for C64 and C128

Footnotes

References

Sources 

 Bagnall, Brian (2005). On the Edge: the Spectacular Rise and Fall of Commodore. Variant Press. . See especially pp. 224–260.
 Tomczyk, Michael (1984). The Home Computer Wars: An Insider's Account of Commodore and Jack Tramiel. COMPUTE! Publications, Inc. .
 Jeffries, Ron. "A best buy for '83: Commodore 64". Creative Computing, January 1983.
 Amiga Format News Special. "Commodore at CeBIT '94". Amiga Format, Issue 59, May 1994.
 Computer Chronicles; "Commodore 64 – Interview with Commodore president Max Toy", 1988.
 The C-64 Scene Database; "– Kjell Nordbø artist page (bio/release history) at CSDb".

External links 

 
 Commodore 64 history, manuals, and photos 
 C64-Wiki (wiki-based encyclopaedia)
 Extensive collection of information on C64 programming
 A History of Gaming Platforms: The Commodore 64 from October 2007
 A Commodore 64 Web Server Using Contiki v2.3* 
 Design case history: the Commodore 64, IEEE Spectrum, March 1985
 Comparing different unit sales analyses

6502-based home computers
American inventions
 
Products introduced in 1982